Statistics of National Association Foot Ball League in season 1910–11.

League standings
                          GP   W   L   T   Pts
 Jersey A.C.               13   8   2   3   19
 Paterson Wilberforce      14   8   4   2   18
 Paterson Rangers          14   6   3   5   17
 West Hudson A.A.          14   6   6   2   14
 Newark F.C.               14   6   6   2   14
 Paterson True Blues       11   4   5   2   10
 Brooklyn F.C.             10   1   6   3    5
 Kearny Scots              12   2   9   1    5

References
NATIONAL ASSOCIATION FOOT BALL LEAGUE (RSSSF)

1910-11
1910–11 domestic association football leagues
1910–11 in American soccer